Sascha Gerstner (born 2 April 1977) is a German musician who has been one of the guitarists and backing vocalists of power metal band Helloween since 2002. He is also a former member of Freedom Call.

Biography 

Gerstner grew up in Nuremberg, West Germany. He started playing keyboards at the age of six and switched to playing guitar when he was thirteen. His main musical influences were the Michael Schenker Group, Toto, Peter Gabriel, Chicago and Journey. At the age of seventeen, he started working as a studio guitarist in Nuremberg.

In 1996, Gerstner joined the cover band scene in South Germany, where he met his former bandmates from Freedom Call. He joined Freedom Call in 1998, with whom he recorded two albums and did three big tours in Europe before leaving in 2001.

After leaving Freedom Call, Gerstner co-founded a recording studio and worked as a producer and songwriter for other young artists until Helloween producer Charlie Bauerfeind contacted him and introduced him to guitarist Michael Weikath. In 2002, Gerstner joined Helloween.

Gerstner is endorsed by Dean Guitars and Blackstar Amplifiers.

Discography

Freedom Call 
 Stairway to Fairyland (1999)
 Taragon – EP (1999)
 Crystal Empire (2001)

Helloween 
Rabbit Don't Come Easy (2003)
Keeper of the Seven Keys: The Legacy (2005)
Keeper of the Seven Keys – The Legacy World Tour 2005/2006
Gambling with the Devil (2007)
Unarmed – Best of 25th Anniversary (2009)
7 Sinners (2010)
Straight Out of Hell (2013)
My God-Given Right (2015)
Helloween (2021)

Palast 
Hush – EP (2016)
Palast (album) (2017)

References

External links 
 Official Facebook page

German heavy metal guitarists
German male guitarists
Helloween members
Living people
Rhythm guitarists
1977 births
Musicians from Stuttgart
Musicians from Nuremberg
Freedom Call members
21st-century guitarists
21st-century German male musicians